Verticordia muelleriana is a flowering plant in the myrtle family, Myrtaceae and is endemic to the south-west of Western Australia. It is an openly branched shrub with relatively large, egg-shaped to circular leaves and long spikes of deep maroon coloured flowers in spring and early summer.

Description

Flowering time is from September to January.

Taxonomy and naming
Verticordia muelleriana was first formally described by Ernst Pritzel in 1904 from a specimen he collected between Watheroo and Coorow and the description was published in Botanische Jahrbücher für Systematik, Pflanzengeschichte und Pflanzengeographie. The specific epithet (muelleriana) honours Ferdinand von Mueller.

The names of two subspecies are accepted by the Australian Plant Census:

When Alex George reviewed the genus Verticordia in 1991, he placed this species in subgenus Eperephes, section Pennuligera along with V. chrysostachys, V. lepidophylla, V. aereiflora, V. dichroma, V. x eurardyensis, V. comosa, V. argentea, V. albida, V. fragrans, V. venusta, V. forrestii, V. serotina, V. oculata, V. etheliana and V. grandis.

Distribution and habitat
This verticordia grows in sand, sometimes with lateritic gravel, usually with other species of Verticordia in woodland and shrubland. It occurs between Coomberdale and Watheroo in the Avon Wheatbelt,  Geraldton Sandplains and Jarrah Forest biogeographic regions.

Conservation
Subspecies muelleriana  is classified as  "Priority Three" by the Western Australian Government Department of Parks and Wildlife meaning that it is poorly known and known from only a few locations but is not under imminent threat. Subspecies minor is classified as "Priority Two"  meaning that it is poorly known and from only one or a few locations.

Use in horticulture
Both subspecies of this verticordia have been propagated from cuttings and by grafting onto Chamelaucium uncinatum rootstock but have been slow to establish in the garden. Those that have, proved to be hardy in sunny situations in a range of soil types.

References

muelleriana
Endemic flora of Western Australia
Myrtales of Australia
Rosids of Western Australia
Plants described in 1904
Taxa named by Ernst Pritzel